Gekko nutaphandi is a species of gecko, a lizard in the family Gekkonidae. The species is endemic to Thailand.

Etymology
The specific name, nutaphandi, is in honor of Thai herpetologist Wirot Nutaphand (1932–2005).

Geographic range
G. nutaphandi is found in Kanchanaburi Province, central western Thailand.

Habitat
The preferred natural habitats of G. nutaphandi are limestone caves and the surrounding forest.

Description
It has 14 rows of dorsal tubercles. The precloacal pores number 17–22 and are arranged in an uninterrupted series. The iris of the eye is red.

Reproduction
G. nutaphandi is oviparous.

References

Further reading
Bauer AM, Sumontha M, Pauwels OSG (2008). "A new red-eyed Gekko (Reptilia: Gekkonidae) from Kanchanaburi Province, Thailand". Zootaxa 1750: 32–42. (Gekko nutaphandi, new species).

Gekko
Reptiles described in 2008
Geckos of Thailand
Endemic fauna of Thailand